Świerczów may refer to:

Świerczów, Lower Silesian Voivodeship (south-west Poland)
Świerczów, Łódź Voivodeship (central Poland)
Świerczów, Subcarpathian Voivodeship (south-east Poland)
Świerczów, Świętokrzyskie Voivodeship (south-central Poland)
Świerczów, Opole Voivodeship (south-west Poland)

See also
Świerszczów (disambiguation)
Świerszczewo (disambiguation)